Santal Bidroha Sardha Satabarsiki Mahavidyalaya, also known as Goaltore College, is an undergraduate,  coeducational college situated in Goaltore, Paschim Medinipur, West Bengal. It was established in the year 2005. The college is under Vidyasagar University.

Departments

Science
Chemistry
Physics
Math
Nutrition
Physiology
Zoology
Botany

Arts
Bengali
English
Sanskrit
Santali
History
Geography& environmental science
Political Science
Philosophy
Education
Physical Education

See also

References

External links
http://www.sbssmahavidyalaya.ac.in/

Universities and colleges in Paschim Medinipur district
Colleges affiliated to Vidyasagar University
Educational institutions established in 2005
2005 establishments in West Bengal